Ganeh Dar (also Romanized as Ganeh Dār and Gonah Dār; also known as Genehdā, Genehdar, Gonah Dār-e Mangūr, and Gonodar) is a village in Lahijan Rural District, in the Central District of Piranshahr County, West Azerbaijan Province, Iran. At the 2006 census, its population was 133, in 23 families.

References 

Populated places in Piranshahr County